Dragon Ball Super is a Japanese anime television series produced by Toei Animation that began airing on July 5, 2015 on Fuji TV. It is the first television series in the Dragon Ball franchise to feature a new story in 18 years. The series begins with a retelling of the events of the last two Dragon Ball Z films, Battle of Gods and Resurrection 'F', which themselves take place during the ten-year timeskip after the events of the "Majin Buu" Saga. The anime was followed by the films Dragon Ball Super: Broly (2018) and Dragon Ball Super: Super Hero (2022).

Thirteen pieces of theme music are used: two opening themes and eleven ending themes. The first opening theme song for episodes 1 to 76 is  performed by Kazuya Yoshii of The Yellow Monkey in both Japanese and English. The lyrics were penned by Yukinojo Mori who has written numerous songs for the Dragon Ball series. Mori wrote the lyrics for the rock number "Genkai Toppa x Survivor". Takafumi Iwasaki composed the music.

The fourth ending theme song for episodes 37 to 49 is "Forever Dreaming" by Czecho No Republic in Japanese and Mystery Skulls in English. The eighth ending theme song for episodes 84 to 96 is "Boogie Back" by Miyu Inoue in Japanese and Lizzy Land in English. The eleventh ending theme song for episodes 122 to 131 is "Lagrima" by OnePixcel in Japanese and Amanda Lee in English.

Arcs overview
In Japan and the United States, Dragon Ball Super was aired year-round continuously, without seasonal breaks; The "arcs" in this list divide the series by story arc according to Toei Animation's promotional material, and do not reflect the pattern in which the series was broadcast or produced.

Episode list

Season 1: God of Destruction Beerus Saga (2015)

Season 2: Golden Frieza Saga (2015–16)

Season 3: Universe 6 and Duplicate Vegeta Sagas (2016)

Season 4: "Future" Trunks Saga (2016–17)

Season 5: Universe Survival Saga (2017–18)

Notes

References

Super